The World Mission Workshop is an annual gathering of students of missions, missionaries and professors of missions associated with Churches of Christ. The workshop meets each year at a college campus. The 2010 workshop, the 50th meeting, was held at Harding University in Searcy, Arkansas where the first workshop was held in 1961.

Past and Future Workshops

References

External links
WMW 50th Anniversary)
Global Missions Conference - 2011

Churches of Christ
Christian missions